Boulevard Plaza is a complex contains Boulevard Plaza 1 and Boulevard Plaza 2 located in Downtown Dubai in Dubai, United Arab Emirates. The towers were proposed for construction on 2005, with the commencement of construction in 2007 and ended in 2010. The Boulevard Plaza 1 rises  and Boulevard Plaza 2 rises , while the complex have 37 and 30 floors respectively.
Boulevard Plaza are located in Downtown Dubai, adjacent to the world's tallest building Burj Khalifa.

See also
 List of tallest buildings in Dubai
 Downtown Dubai

References

External links
 Boulevard Plaza 1 CTBUH
 Boulevard Plaza 2 CTBUH
 Boulevard Plaza 1 Emporis
 Boulevard Plaza 2 Emporis
 Boulevard Plaza 1 Skyscraperpage
 Boulevard Plaza 2 Skyscraperpage
 Emaar.com

Office buildings completed in 2011
Skyscraper office buildings in Dubai